{{Automatic taxobox
| image = Cephalop.jpg
| image_caption =Pterygioteuthis giardi
| taxon = Pterygioteuthis
| authority = Fischer, 1896
| type_species = Pterygioteuthis giardi
| type_species_authority = Fischer, 1896 
| subdivision_ranks = Species
| subdivision = 
Pterygioteuthis gemmata Chun, 1908
Pterygioteuthis giardi Fischer, 1896
Pterygioteuthis hoylei (Pfeffer, 1912)Pterygioteuthis microlampas Berry, 1913
}}Pterygioteuthis is a genus of squid in the family Pyroteuthidae. Members are differentiated from the genus Pyroteuthis'' due to size and head shape. The genus is characterised by the presence of a lidded photophore over each eye.

References

External links
Tree of Life web project: Pterygioteuthis

Squid
Bioluminescent molluscs